Stop the Machine was the second album from Northern Ireland-based rock band, Energy Orchard, and was released in 1992. The album was dedicated to "the memory of Rosemary Breslin."

Track listing
 "(When I'm With You I'm) All Alone" - 2:59
 "It's All Over Now, Baby Blue" - (Bob Dylan) - 3:56
 "How the West Was Won" - 2:48
 "My Cheating Heart" - 4:27
 "Pain, Heartbreak and Redemption" - 4:54
 "Slieveban Drive" - 4:33
 "Blue Eyed Boy" - 3:51
 "Stop the Machine" - 3:34
 "Tell Your Mother" - 2:54
 "Three Days on the Tear" - 3:34
 "All Your Jewels" - 5:26
 "Little Paleface" - 4:35

Personnel
Energy Orchard
Bap Kennedy - vocals, guitar, harmonica
Paul Toner - lead guitar, backing vocals
Spade McQuade - rhythm guitar, mandolin, backing vocals
Steve Lawrence - bass
Kevin Breslin - keyboards
David Toner - drums
with:
Barry Beckett - piano on "It's All Over Now, Baby Blue"
Frankie Finneran - whistle on "Slieveban Drive"
Technology
Jack Joseph Puig - engineer

References

1992 albums
Energy Orchard albums
albums produced by Glyn Johns
MCA Records albums